Pasabandar (also Romanized as Pasā Bandar; also known as Pasā and Pas Bandar) is a village in Sand-e Mir Suiyan Rural District, Dashtiari District, Chabahar County, Sistan and Baluchestan Province, Iran. At the 2006 census, its population was 696, in 109 families. It is the southernmost town of Iran.

References 

Populated places in Dashtiari County